is an action role-playing game by Nihon Falcom. Originally released in 1991 for the NEC PC-9801 and FM Towns, it was later ported to the Super NES and PC Engine CD-ROM² in the mid 1990s, including an expanded re-release titled Brandish Renewal. The game was the first in the Brandish series and was followed by three sequels. A remake, Brandish: The Dark Revenant, was released for the PlayStation Portable in Japan in 2009 and worldwide in 2015.

Gameplay
Brandish is a top-down view dungeon crawler game. The original version of the game uses mouse controls from a real-time overhead view, where the player can move the warrior character Ares (known as Varik in the original English version) forward and backward, turn, strafe, and attack by clicking on boxes surrounding the player character. The player's objective is to escape from a labyrinth of over 40 floors filled with various monsters, traps and puzzles.

Brandish: The Dark Revenant turns the game's female antagonist Dela Delon into an optional alternate player character. Dela, a magician, plays differently from the protagonist Ares the warrior. The game's "Dela Mode" is shorter (lasting about 10 hours as compared to some 20 hours with Ares) but harder than the main scenario.

Plot
A long time ago, the small kingdom of Vittoria was built around a lofty tower, which pierced the sky. The people of the city, guarded by a mighty Dragon, lived in peace and abundance. However, King Bistalle, the ruler of Vittoria, desired to expand his kingdom and ordered the scholars to research the Tower. Soon he was brought a tome written in an ancient language. As they were deciphering the tome, some scholars feared that they might be laying their hands on the forbidden knowledge of the ancients. The tome reads, "The Great Guardian of Vittoria, the Dragon, and the Essence of Power lies in the top of the Tower; the one who possesses the Essence will possess all." Undaunted by these otherwise ominous words, Bistalle decided to make this Essence of Power his own. He secretly organized an army which soon attacked the Tower and overwhelmed the Dragon. But as Bistalle grasped at the Essence of Power, the Dragon gave up its own life to destroy it. The Essence, losing control, transformed the King into a hideous monster and sank the entire kingdom of Vittoria, including the great tower, under the ground. All people on the surface forgot about Vittoria and the Tower in its center, and a thousand years passed.

One day, a swordsman named Ares is pursued by his nemesis, the sorceress Dora Doran who seeks revenge for his slaying of her master. When Dela catches up with Ares and attacks, her magic causes the ground beneath them to collapse and both fall into the cursed Ruins of Vittoria. The player assumes the role of Ares and must escape from the dangerous ruin, with the vengeful Dela constantly in pursuit of him. She is also interested in escaping the maze herself and the two meet repeatedly. The ending changes slightly depending on whether or not Ares helps her out of danger during certain events late in the game.

Release
Originally released by Nihon Falcom in 1991 for the NEC PC-9801 and FM Towns home computers (and also ported to MS-DOS exclusively in Korea by Mantra and Ssangyong in 1996), Brandish was later released for the Super Nintendo Entertainment System (SNES) and PC Engine CD-ROM². The PC Engine version was published by NEC and features CD quality music as well as vocal dialogue and narration. The PC-98 version was re-released as Brandish Renewal in 1995, with some new music and hard drive support.

The SNES port is the only English language version of the game ever released. It was published by Koei in 1994 in Japan and a few months later (in February 1995) in North America. Due to Nintendo of America's policies at that time, the game was regionally censored in its depiction of Dela's revealing costume and the plot was considerably altered.

Reception

GamePro gave the SNES version a mixed review, commenting that the combat, though simplistic, is "more fun than it sounds". They criticized the "practically nonexistent" sound effects and repetitive music, and complained that the way the automap does not rotate along with the scenery is confusing, but concluded that the game's long length and addictive maze-crawling make it worthwhile. They gave it ratings of 4.0 for control, 3.5 for graphics, 2.5 for sound, and 4.5 out of 5 for funfactor. VideoGames gave it a score of 7 out of 10, commenting that, with its relatively weak graphics, Brandish "goes for a solid gameplay over flash." RPGFan gave it an overall score of 75%.

Brandish: The Dark Revenant

Brandish: The Dark Revenant is a 3D remake of Brandish developed by Nihon Falcom for the PlayStation Portable. It released in Japan in 2009 and worldwide by Xseed Games in 2015.

Reception

According to Kurt Kalata of Hardcore Gaming 101, "the PSP version is not only by far the definitive version of the first Brandish, but it's probably the best game in the series, period." The English version of Brandish: The Dark Revenant was universally well received in the West upon its delayed release for a Metacritic score of 81%. It got an 8/10 from Destructoid, a 4.5/5 from Hardcore Gamer, and four out of five stars from USgamer. Other review scores included B+ from Gaming Age, 7/10 from Push Square, 79% from RPGFan, and 7/10 from RPG Site.

Related media
Brandish Storybook (ブランディッシュ・ストーリーブック)　() is a novelization of the game, co-authored by Katsunori Inoue and Suzuki Noriyuki and published in 1992. The story is told from the perspectives of both Ares and Dela. It was later made available for free (in Japanese) at Falcom's official website.

Several soundtracks with the music from the game were also released, including Perfect Collection Brandish (KICA1102) and Falcom Neo Classic (KICA1114-5) in 1992, Falcom Special Box '93 (KICA9012-5) and Falcom Ending Collection 1987–1992 (KICA1132-3) in 1993, Brandish Piano Collection (KICA1153) in 1994, Falcom Special Box '96 (KICA9026-28) in 1996, Falcom Classics (KICA1201) in 1997, and Brandish ~The Dark Revenant~ Original Sound Track (NW10102800) and Brandish Original Sound Track ～FM TOWNS & Renewal～ (BR-OST-FR) in 2009.

1995's audio drama CD Drama Brandish Gaiden (CDドラマ ブランディッシュ外伝) features voice acting by Yasunori Matsumoto (Ares), Kikuko Inoue (Dela), Junko Iwao, Yūko Mizutani, Kyōko Hikami, Yūko Miyamura, Minoru Inaba, Ryōtarō Okiayu, Yuri Amano, Kaori, Jūrōta Kosugi and Masako Katsuki (the cast is different from in the game's PC Engine CD-ROM² version). The drama was released as a part of Falcom Special Box '96 and Falcom Special Box '97 (KICA9029-31).

Legacy

Brandish proved popular enough in Japan to warrant two direct sequels exclusively in Japan that continued the adventures of Ares and Dela: 1993's Brandish 2: The Planet Buster and 1994's Brandish 3: Spirit of Balcan. Another game, 1996's Brandish VT (Brandish 4), features a new story and characters. Dela also makes an appearance as a support character in Falcom's Ys vs. Trails in the Sky (2010), and her costume was added to Rachel's wardrobe in Dead or Alive 5 Last Round.

References

External links
Nihon Falcom page: Brandish, BTDR 
Xseed games page: BTDR

1991 video games
2009 video games
Action role-playing video games
DOS games
Fantasy video games
FM Towns games
Koei games
NEC PC-9801 games
Nihon Falcom games
PlayStation Portable games
Single-player video games
Super Nintendo Entertainment System games
Top-down video games
TurboGrafx-CD games
Video games developed in Japan
Video games featuring female protagonists
Video games with alternate endings
Windows games